Jason Mangone is an American football coach. He is the head football coach at The College at Brockport, State University of New York, a position he has held since 2013. Mangone played college football as a quarterback, first at Alfred University in Alfred, New York, before transferring to Brockport. He became an assistant coach at Brockport in 1999 and was promoted to offensive coordinator in 2004.

Mangone is a native of Lancaster, New York and now resides in Henrietta, New York.

Head coaching record

References

External links
 Brockport profile

Year of birth missing (living people)
Living people
American football quarterbacks
Alfred Saxons football players
Brockport Golden Eagles football coaches
Brockport Golden Eagles football players
People from Lancaster, New York
Sportspeople from Erie County, New York
Players of American football from New York (state)